Team 33 is a 1987 Soviet drama film directed by Nikolai Gusarov.

Plot 
The film tells about the lieutenant colonel, who should accompany the team of conscripts to the Far East.

Cast 
 Yuriy Nazarov as Lt. Col. Nikitin
 Aleksandr Rakhlenko as Capt. Tsvetkov
 Sergey Tezov as Komsorg Andrei Dyomin
 Sergei Sozinov as Viktor Kupryanovich Barabanov
 Aleksei Rozhdestvensky as Igor Yampolsky
 Gennadiy Sidorov as Sokolov
 Sergei Pogozhin as Kozin
 Valeri Nemeshayev as Pakholkin
 Vladimir Belousov as Alexandr Sergeyevich Golubok

References

External links 
 

1987 films
1980s Russian-language films
Soviet drama films
1987 drama films